Nightwing is a 1977 thriller novel by Martin Cruz Smith, who adapted it for a 1979 film with the same title directed by Arthur Hiller.

Plot summary
A disgruntled, disenfranchised Hopi shaman sets out to "end the world" by way of a ritual invocation of the Hopi god of death. Shortly after his mutilated corpse is discovered by a skeptical Tewa deputy the body count begins to rise as more strangely slashed and bloodied victims are found.

The book has many elements: part love triangle; part Native American case study; part supernatural thriller. It was the author's own tribal ancestry which inspired the writing of this fictionalized anthropological mini-survey.

References

1977 American novels
American horror novels
American thriller novels
Novels by Martin Cruz Smith
Native American novels
American novels adapted into films
Novels set in the United States
Southwestern United States in fiction
W. W. Norton & Company books